Akhuleh (also Romanized as Ākhūleh; also known as Ākholā, Ākhūlā, and Akhulu) is a village in Tazeh Kand Rural District of Khosrowshah District, Tabriz County, East Azerbaijan province, Iran. At the 2006 National Census, its population was 2,351 in 441 households. The following census in 2011 counted 2,680 people in 800 households. The latest census in 2016 showed a population of 2,826 people in 874 households; it was the largest village in its rural district.

References 

Tabriz County

Populated places in East Azerbaijan Province

Populated places in Tabriz County